Sonia Barrio Gutiérrez (born 13 December 1969 in Madrid) is a former field hockey player from Spain, who was a member of the Women's National Team that surprisingly won the golden medal at the 1992 Summer Olympics in Barcelona.

Barrio also competed in the 1996 Summer Olympics in Atlanta, Georgia, where Spain finished in 8th and last position. Four years later, when Sydney hosted the Games, she was a member of the team that was defeated by the Netherlands in the bronze medal match.

References
sports-reference

External links
 

1969 births
Spanish female field hockey players
Olympic field hockey players of Spain
Field hockey players at the 1992 Summer Olympics
Field hockey players at the 1996 Summer Olympics
Field hockey players at the 2000 Summer Olympics
Living people
Olympic gold medalists for Spain
Field hockey players from Madrid
Olympic medalists in field hockey
Medalists at the 1992 Summer Olympics
20th-century Spanish women